This page tracks the progress of the Lithuania national basketball team participating at the EuroBasket 2013.

Main Squad

Depth chart

Candidates that did not make it to the final team

Missing players

Friendly matches

EuroBasket 2013 matches

Preliminary round 

|}

All times are local (UTC+2)

Second round 

|}

All times are local (UTC+2)

Knockout stage 
Quarterfinal

Semifinal

Final

Orders, decorations, and medals
National team players, coaches and staff members were awarded with State orders, decorations and medals by Lithuania President Dalia Grybauskaitė.

Student Squad 

The student roster is composed of players under the age of 25 who stand out from other young Lithuanian basketball players. Some of the players are from the so–called "golden generation" – players born in 1992 who won 5 gold medals in 5 youth competitions. Players from this squad may also be chosen to represent the senior national team in the case of injuries. The team competed in the World's 27th Universiade in Kazan from July 6 until July 17 and finished in 5th place. Vytenis Čižauskas and Adas Juškevičius were chosen as candidates for the main squad.

Depth chart

Friendly matches

Universiade matches

References 

Lithuania
2013
Eurobasket